Harvey Hollister Bundy Sr. (March 30, 1888 – October 7, 1963) was an American attorney who served as a special assistant to the Secretary of War during World War II. He was the father of William Bundy and McGeorge Bundy, who both served at high levels as government advisors.

Early life and education
Harvey Hollister Bundy was born in Grand Rapids, Michigan, the son of McGeorge, a lawyer, and Mary Goodhue (Hollister) Bundy; he was grandson to Solomon Bundy, a lawyer and New York Congressman. Bundy attended Yale University and was initiated in the Skull and Bones in 1909. He went on to earn his law degree from Harvard Law School in 1914. That same year, he began working as a law clerk for Supreme Court Justice Oliver Wendell Holmes.

Career 
Bundy became a prominent attorney in Boston at his father-in-law's law firm, Putnam, Putnam & Bell.

Bundy and his wife Katherine met Colonel Henry L. Stimson, and the three became friends. Their sons grew up knowing Stimson as a family friend and colleague of their father. Working under President Herbert Hoover, Stimson appointed Bundy as Assistant Secretary of State in July 1931 until March 1933. Bundy also served as special legal assistant to the U.S. Secretary of the Treasury.

During World War II he served again under Stimson, then Secretary of War under President Franklin D. Roosevelt, as his Special Assistant on Atomic Matters beginning in 1941. He served as liaison between Stimson and the director of the Office of Scientific Research and Development, Vannevar Bush. Bundy also helped implement the Marshall Plan after the war. After the war, his son McGeorge Bundy worked with Stimson to co-author his autobiography, On Active Service in Peace and War (1947).

After the war, he became president of the board of trustees of the World Peace Foundation.

In 1952, he succeeded John Foster Dulles as chairman of the Carnegie Endowment for International Peace, serving until 1958. (Note: son William Bundy became embroiled in a 1953 scandal, when Senator Joseph McCarthy cited his earlier $400 contribution to Alger Hiss's defense fund in the Hiss-Chambers case. Bundy explained that Donald Hiss, Alger's brother, worked with him at Covington & Burling. Allen Dulles and Vice President Richard M. Nixon defended him, and the matter dropped. Previously, Hiss had served as president at Carnegie in 1946–1949.)

Personal life 
In 1917, Bundy married Katherine Lawrence Putnam, daughter of William Lowell Putnam and niece to Harvard president Abbott Lawrence Lowell. They had three sons, Harvey Bundy Jr., William Bundy and McGeorge Bundy.

At the age of 75, Harvey Hollister Bundy Sr died on Monday, October 7, 1963 at his home in the City of Boston, Massachusetts.

See also 
 List of law clerks of the Supreme Court of the United States (Seat 2)

References 

1888 births
1963 deaths
People from Grand Rapids, Michigan
20th-century American lawyers
Yale University alumni
Law clerks of the Supreme Court of the United States
Harvard Law School alumni
Carnegie Endowment for International Peace
Lawyers from Boston